Kibale National Park is a national park in western Uganda, protecting moist evergreen rainforest. Despite encompassing primarily moist evergreen forest, it contains a diverse array of landscapes. Kibale is one of the last remaining expanses to contain both lowland and montane forests. In eastern Africa, it sustains the last significant expanse of pre-montane forest.

The park was gazetted in 1932 and formally established in 1993 to protect a large area of forest previously managed as a logged forest reserve. The park forms a continuous forest with Queen Elizabeth National Park. This adjoining of the parks creates a  wildlife corridor. It is an important ecotourism and safari destination, well-known for its population of habituated chimpanzees and twelve other species of primates. It is also the location of the Makerere University Biological Field Station.

Locals and the park
Two major tribes, the Batooro and Bakiga, inhabit the area around the park. They use the park for food, fuel, and other resources with the help of the Uganda Wildlife Authority. In the last century, the population around the park has increased by sevenfold. This is speculated to be because the park directly brings in revenue for those living around it and the tourism industry creates jobs. In addition, many farmers believe that the soil is better for growing crops year round. This increase in the population has caused the area around the park to be divided and developed or turned into plantations and farmland, and demand for firewood asserts pressure on the park's wildlife habitat. Organizations like the New Nature Foundation are working to restore harmony to the people-park relationship by empowering local citizens to meet their needs in sustainable ways. Cutting trees for fuel has already strained many of the forest areas outside Kibale.

Biodiversity
Kibale National Forest has one of the highest diversity and concentration of primates in Africa. It is home to a large number of endangered chimpanzees, as well as the red colobus monkey (status: Endangered) and the rare L'Hoest's monkey (Vulnerable).

Fauna

There are 13 species of primates in Kibale National Park. The park protects several well-studied habituated communities of common chimpanzee, as well as several species of Central African monkey including the Uganda mangabey (Lophocebus ugandae), the Ugandan red colobus (Procolobus tephrosceles) and the L'Hoest's monkey. Other primates that are found in the park include the black-and-white colobus (Colobus guereza) and the blue monkey (Cercopithecus mitis). The park's population of elephants travels between the park and Queen Elizabeth National Park. Other terrestrial mammals that are found within Kibale National Park include red and blue duikers, bushbucks, sitatungas, bushpigs, giant forest hogs, common warthogs, and African buffalo. The carnivores that are present include leopards, African golden cats, servals, different mongooses and two species of otter. In addition, lions visit the park on occasion.

Bird life is also prolific. The park boasts 325 species of birds, including the olive long-tailed cuckoo, western tinkerbird, two species of pittas (African and green-breasted) and the grey parrot. The ground thrush (Turdus kibalensis) is endemic to Kibale National Park.

Tourism 
Kibale National Park is a popular destination for tourist to track the chimpanzees in Uganda. Chimpanzee tracking has taken place in the park since 1993, with successful tracking rates of 90%. Other popular tourism activities include the chimpanzee habituation exercise, nature walks and bird watching. Tourists visiting Kibale National Park make a 5 hours drive from Kampala to reach the park. The park is also connected by daily domestic flights from Kajjansi Airfield and Murchison Falls National Park, which land at Fort Portal Airstrip. The park offers a range of tented camps and safari lodges to accommodate visitors.

Primates

Primates are very common in Kibale National Forest. The forest has some of the highest abundances of species of primates in the area. There are many species of primates and these species persist in the less disturbed areas of the forest in their natural habitats. There are disturbances that are hindering some of these species.

Logging effects on primates
Logging effects have been studied specifically by a few people. Most studies find that logging seems to be having a negative effect on the species but there are some contradictions.

Some species of primates are found less frequently in logged areas but others were unaffected. This study helps reveal the importance of stopping logging in certain regions of Kibale National Forest. The species from the study are shown below. These species densities show the effect of logging on each separate species:

	* Heavily logged areas:

		* Found in lower densities: chimpanzees (Pan troglodytes), redtails (Cercopithecus ascanius)

		* Found in mixed densities: red colobus (Procolobus badius), black-and-white colobus (Colobus guereza)

	* Unlogged areas:

		* Found in mixed densities: red colobus (Procolobus badius), black-and-white colobus (Colobus guereza)

Another study conducted by Chapman and his colleagues in 2000 showed that many species of primates returned and came back to their original densities in lightly logged forest but in the heavily logged forest primates species were not able to recover. This study helps support that Kibale National Forest needs to develop a light logging system different from their heavily logging system they conduct now.

Degraded agricultural lands effect on primates
Degraded lands occur when land is cleared for agriculture and then abandoned after a few years. These lands are coming back at different rates and some are showing no possibility of re-growth.  The effect these lands have on primates is still slightly unknown but some studies have started weeding out answers. One study found that most species of primates were found evenly distributed throughout the entire forest, whether there was agriculture encroachment or not.

Diet of primates in Kibale National Park
Different species have different diets and many of the species are folivorous. One study actually found that black-and-white colobus monkeys (Colobus guereza) eat younger leaves over older leaves (this is thought to happen because the leaves have more protein and are easier to digest).

Flora

There are approximately 229 species of trees found within the moist tropical forests of the park. Some endangered timber species of trees include Cordia millenii, Entandrophragma angolense, and Lovoa swynnertonnii. The forest understory is dominated by shade-tolerant shrubs and herbs, which include Palisota schweinfurthii and Pollia condensata, in addition to ferns and broad leaf grasses.

Forest management

Forestry research in the park
Many studies have been conducted within the park to assess the factors influencing forest regeneration and forest management techniques. One such study's results suggested that forest restoration could be achieved through preventing fires within the park and allowing natural succession to occur so that the grasslands formed due to human activity could naturally regenerate to forests. The results showed that plots within the park that had the longest history of fire exclusion had the highest species diversity of trees. Furthermore, species of trees that required animal dispersal of their seeds were far more abundant than non-animal dispersed species in the plot with the longest duration of fire exclusion. This suggests that seed dispersing animals were also more abundant in areas where fire was excluded. Lastly, the presence of seed dispersers and animal dispersed species of trees in some grassland plots suggest that suppressing fire and allowing natural seed dispersal to occur can encourage forest regeneration. Another study evaluated the use of exotic pine and cypress tree plantations as a forest restoration technique within the park. This study showed a high level of natural regeneration of indigenous trees within pine plantations most likely due to the use of these plantations by seed dispersing animals such as redtail monkeys, chimpanzees, duikers, and bushpigs, all of which were sited or tracked within the plantations.

Wild coffee project
Robusta coffee grows natively in the Kibale forest area. From 1999 to 2002 an effort was made to commercialize this coffee as a premium consumer brand, emulating and extending the success of shade grown in Central America. Revenue from the coffee production was intended to finance conservation management activities.

Initial funding for project development came from USAID. The project was implemented with funding from the Ford Foundation and $750,000 from the World Bank Global Environment Facility. The project had initial success in setting up local production standards and procedures and control infrastructure. Initially it was led by the Uganda Coffee Trade Federation, until the independent US-based non-profit Kibale Forest Foundation was created to take over the project. Organic certification was delivered by the Swedish KRAV labeling firm. It was subsequently discovered that there was no demand for the product, as the robusta variety is perceived as inferior to arabica coffee typically demanded by the premium market. Various blending schemes were turned down by coffee distributors. Project leaders estimated that $800,000 in marketing expenditure would be required to create demand.

External links

Uganda Wildlife Authority
Kibale Forest National Park
Research Opportunities at the Makerere University Biological Field Station, Uganda
Visitor Guide to Kibale Forest National Park
Things to Do in Kibale Forest National Park
Wikimapia Location

See also
 Kibaale District

References

Sources:
 "Kibale Forest". National Parks of East Africa. N.p., 2010. Web. 24 Sept 2011. <https://web.archive.org/web/20160304003342/http://kibalenationalpark.com/information.html>.
 
 
 
 

National parks of Uganda
Protected areas established in 1993
Kabarole District
Kibaale District
1993 establishments in Uganda
Forestry in Uganda
Important Bird Areas of Uganda
Albertine Rift montane forests